Youth for Sale is a 1924 silent American drama film directed by Christy Cabanne and starring May Allison, Sigrid Holmquist, and Richard Bennett. It was released on August 1, 1924.

Cast list 
 May Allison as Molly Malloy
 Sigrid Holmquist as Connie Sutton
 Richard Bennett as Montgomery Breck
 Charles Emmett Mack as Tom Powers
 Alice Chapin as Mrs. Malloy
 Tom Blake as Bill Brophy
 Dorothy Allen as Pansy Mears
 Charles Byer as George Archibald
 Harold Foshay as Edward Higgins

References

External links 
 
 
 

American silent feature films
Films directed by Christy Cabanne
American black-and-white films
Silent American drama films
1924 drama films
1924 films
1920s English-language films
1920s American films